Shedrack Anderson III (born February 4, 1977) is an American actor. He was born in Los Angeles, California. He is married to Kathryn Hunt.

Career
He got his big break as a lost boy in the Steven Spielberg film Hook, then starred in the NBC teen series Just Deal as Jermaine Green. He then appeared in Fat Albert. He starred as Tommy in Lifetime's Gracie's Choice. He starred in Warriors of Virtue 2, and has guest starred on many television series including Boston Public, The Parkers, Hollywood Lives, Hip Hop Massive and The Division. Anderson was a recurring star on Disney's Phil of the Future. Anderson attended the Los Angeles County High School for the Arts, where he won the Ahmanson Scholarship and Emerging Artist of the Year Award from PBS. After high school, he attended the Juilliard School in New York, where he became interested in dance. He was a principal dancer of Ballet Hispanico of New York and became an assistant choreographer for Alvin Ailey American Dance Theatre. Shedrack wrote, directed, and starred in the film Blood River with fellow lost boy Dante Basco. He was also a lead in The Rookie, a spin-off of 24. Shedrack began his own production company in 1999 to produce his own films. He married Pilates instructor Kathryn Hunt in 2010 and has one daughter.

Appearances
 A lost boy from Hook
 Bernie from Boston Public
 Chucky from Warriors of Virtue: The Return of Tao
 Jermaine from Just Deal
 Tommy from Gracie's Choice
 Rudy from Fat Albert
 Chuck Taylor from Drive-Thru
 Ryan Jackson from Greekshow
 Todd Bridges from Behind the Camera, Different Strokes

References

External links
 

1977 births
Living people
African-American male actors
Male actors from Los Angeles
21st-century African-American people
20th-century African-American people